|}
{| class="collapsible collapsed" cellpadding="0" cellspacing="0" style="clear:right; float:right; text-align:center; font-weight:bold;" width="280px"
! colspan="3" style="border:1px solid black; background-color: #77DD77;" | Also Ran

The 1987 Epsom Derby was a horse race which took place at Epsom Downs on Wednesday 3 June 1987. It was the 208th running of the Derby, and it was won by the pre-race favourite Reference Point. The winner was ridden by Steve Cauthen and trained by Henry Cecil.

Race details
 Sponsor: Ever Ready
 Winner's prize money: £282,025
 Going: Good
 Number of runners: 19
 Winner's time: 2m 33.90s

Full result

* The distances between the horses are shown in lengths or shorter. shd = short-head; nk = neck.† Trainers are based in Great Britain unless indicated.

Winner's details
Further details of the winner, Reference Point:

 Foaled: 26 February 1984, in Great Britain
 Sire: Mill Reef; Dam: Home on the Range (Habitat)
 Owner: Louis Freedman
 Breeder: Louis Freedman
 Rating in 1987 International Classifications: 135

Form analysis

Two-year-old races
Notable runs by the future Derby participants as two-year-olds in 1986.

 Reference Point – 1st Futurity Stakes
 Most Welcome – 5th Middle Park Stakes
 Bellotto – 1st Acomb Stakes
 Groom Dancer – 1st Prix Herod, 8th Prix de la Salamandre, 1st Prix de Condé, 3rd Critérium de Saint-Cloud
 Ajdal – 1st Dewhurst Stakes
 Love the Groom – 3rd Futurity Stakes
 Gulf King – 8th Chesham Stakes, 6th Prix de la Salamandre, 1st Beresford Stakes

The road to Epsom
Early-season appearances in 1987 and trial races prior to running in the Derby.

 Reference Point – 1st Dante Stakes
 Most Welcome – 3rd Craven Stakes, 13th 2,000 Guineas (finished 3rd, placed last)
 Bellotto – 3rd Greenham Stakes, 2nd 2,000 Guineas
 Sir Harry Lewis – 1st Dee Stakes
 Entitled – 2nd Irish 2,000 Guineas 
 Mountain Kingdom – 3rd Easter Stakes, 2nd Lingfield Derby Trial 
 Groom Dancer – 1st Prix Omnium II, 1st Prix de Guiche, 1st Prix Lupin
 Sadjiyd – 1st Prix Noailles, 1st Prix Hocquart
 Ajdal – 1st Craven Stakes, 4th 2,000 Guineas (finished 5th, placed 4th), Irish 2,000 Guineas (finished 3rd, disqualified)
 Persifleur – 1st Prix Greffulhe, 3rd Dante Stakes
 Ascot Knight – 2nd Dante Stakes
 Love the Groom – 4th Craven Stakes
 Ibn Bey – 5th Lingfield Derby Trial, 1st Predominate Stakes
 Legal Bid – 1st Feilden Stakes, 1st Lingfield Derby Trial
 Gulf King – 6th Craven Stakes, 1st Sandown Classic Trial, 5th Dante Stakes
 Water Boatman – 3rd Feilden Stakes, 6th Lingfield Derby Trial, 2nd Gallinule Stakes
 Alwasmi – 2nd Predominate Stakes
 Romantic Prince – 4th Dante Stakes

Subsequent Group 1 wins
Group 1 / Grade I victories after running in the Derby.

 Reference Point – King George VI and Queen Elizabeth Stakes (1987), St. Leger (1987)
 Sir Harry Lewis – Irish Derby (1987)
 Ajdal – July Cup (1987), William Hill Sprint Championship (1987)
 Ibn Bey – Gran Premio d'Italia (1987), Preis von Europa (1989), Deutschland-Preis (1990), Irish St. Leger (1990)

Subsequent breeding careers
Leading progeny of participants in the 1987 Epsom Derby.

Sires of Classic winners
Reference Point (1st)
 Ivyanna - 1st Oaks d'Italia (1992) - Dam of Snowflake (2nd Nassau Stakes 2001)
 Hill of Snow - Dam of Preseli (1st Moyglare Stud Stakes 1999) and Snowfire (2nd 1000 Guineas Stakes 2002)
 Sand Reef - 2nd Prix Jean de Chaudenay (1995)
 Racing Blue - 3rd Deutsches St. Leger (1993)
Groom Dancer (7th)
 Groom Tesse - 1st Derby Italiano (2004)
 Pursuit Of Love - 3rd 2000 Guineas Stakes (1992)
 Le Balafre - 1st Prix Jean Prat (1993)
 Lord Of Men - 1st Prix de la Salamandre (1995)
Ascot Knight (11th) - Exported to Canada
 Bahamian Knight - 1st Derby Italiano (1996)
 Influent - 1st Man o' War Stakes (1997)
 Plenty Of Sugar - 2nd Coaching Club American Oaks (1994)
 Ladies' Day - Dam of He's No Pie Eater (1st Rosehill Guineas, 1st Chipping Norton Stakes 2007)

Sires of Group/Grade One winners
Most Welcome (2nd)
 Arctic Owl - 1st Irish St. Leger (2000)
 Suances - 1st Prix Jean Prat (2000)
 Star - Dam of Pastoral Pursuits and Goodricke
 Kissair - 1st Triumph Hurdle (1995)
Bellotto (3rd) - Exported to Australia
 Bullwinkle - 1st South Australian Derby (1994)
 My Brightia - 1st Crown Oaks (1996)
 Littorio - 1st The BMW (2010)
 Clang - Dam of Calaway Gal (1st Golden Slipper Stakes 2002), Clangalang (1st Australian Derby 2003) and Black Piranha (1st Stradbroke Handicap 2009,2010)
Ajdal (9th)
 Cezanne - 1st Irish Champion Stakes (1994)
 Garah - 3rd Temple Stakes 1993 - Dam of Olden Times (1st Prix Jean Prat 2001) and Festoso (3rd Cheveley Park Stakes 2007)
 Avila - Dam of Dilshaan and Darrfonah (2nd Prix Marcel Boussac 2006)
 Homage - Dam of Mark Of Esteem

Sires of National Hunt horses
Sir Harry Lewis (3rd)
 Mighty Man - 1st Long Walk Hurdle (2006)
 Diamond Harry - 1st Hennessy Gold Cup (2010)
 Harry Topper - 1st Denman Chase (2014)
 Unowhatimeanharry - 1st Champion Stayers Hurdle (2017, 2019)

Other Stallions
Love The Groom (12th) - Exported to Italy - Maktub (thrice placed in Italian Group One contests)Ibn Bey (13th) - Exported to Japan - Damsire of Big Grass (3rd February Stakes 2007)Entitled (5th) - Minor flat and jumps winners - Damsire of River CharmPersifleur (10th) - Minor jumps winners in FranceSadjiyd (8th) - Exported to Saudi ArabiaLegal Bid (14th) - Exported to Canada - Exported to GermanyAlwasmi (18th) - Exported to Canada - Exported to Germany - Exported to Italy

References

External links
 Colour Chart – Derby 1987

Epsom Derby
 1987
1987 in British sport
Epsom Derby
20th century in Surrey